Silvestro Milani (born 25 February 1958) is an Italian former professional racing cyclist. He rode in one edition of the Tour de France and four editions of the Giro d'Italia. He also competed in the team pursuit event at the 1980 Summer Olympics.

References

External links
 

1958 births
Living people
Italian male cyclists
Cyclists from the Province of Bergamo
Cyclists at the 1980 Summer Olympics
Olympic cyclists of Italy